Nolhivaram (Dhivehi: ނޮޅިވަރަމް), Nolhivaran or Nolhivaramu is one of the inhabited islands of Haa Dhaalu Atoll administrative division and geographically part of Thiladhummathi Atoll in the north of the Maldives.

History
It is believed to be one of the oldest inhabited islands in the Maldives and ethnographically very different from the rest of the islands. This is evident from the name ending in varam or varan. A separate indigenous group different from the first Maldivian settlers is said to have come from South India and named their islands Varam (also the islands formerly called Kuruhinnavaram and Giraavaram contained their settlements). Nolhivaram was among the islands severely damaged during the great cyclone of 1821 that hit the northern atolls of the Maldives. This was during the reign of Sultan Muhammad Mueenuddeen I.

Geography

Demography

References

Islands of the Maldives